Captain Joseph Nourse CB (23 June 1779 – 4 September 1824) was a Royal Navy officer who became commander-in-chief of the Cape of Good Hope Station.

Naval career
Nourse joined the Royal Navy in 1793 and, having been promoted, to captain, was given command of the frigate HMS Fridericksteen. He transferred to the command of the fourth-rate HMS Severn and took part in the capture and burning of Washington on 24 August 1814 during the War of 1812. He became commander-in-chief of the Cape of Good Hope Station in 1822, engaged with combating the slave trade, before dying of malaria in Mauritius in 1824.

References

Royal Navy officers
1779 births
1824 deaths
Companions of the Order of the Bath